"A Little More Love" is a song recorded by British singer-songwriter and actress Lisa Stansfield, released in June 1992 as the fifth single from her second album, Real Love (1991). The song was written by Stansfield, Ian Devaney and Andy Morris, and produced by Devaney and Morris. On 30 June 1992, it was released as a single in the United States and peaked at number thirty on the US Billboard Hot R&B/Hip-Hop Songs chart. The live music video recorded at the Wembley Stadium was also released. "Set Your Loving Free" which was included on the B-side of the single and remixed by Masters at Work, reached number twenty on the Billboard Hot Dance Club Songs chart.

Critical reception
David Taylor-Wilson from Bay Area Reporter complimented the song as an "exciting" number, adding that "clubs will have a field day". Larry Flick from Billboard described "A Little More Love" as a "soft and rhythmic gem", and a "tasty treat". He remarked that Stansfield is, "as usual", in "mighty fine voice, giving this romantic plea an affecting, dramatic edge without resorting to clichéd acrobatics." Rufer & Fell from the Gavin Report commented, "The lady is making some pretty mature sounding records these days. Count this one among the classiest around." In his album review, Robbert Tilli from Music & Media felt the song comes closest to Marvin Gaye's "Sexual Healing", "when it comes to sensuality". Parry Gettelman from Orlando Sentinel remarked that Stansfield's voice "is sultry yet subtle".

Track listings
 US 7" single/cassette
"A Little More Love" (Album Edit) – 4:10 
"Set Your Loving Free" (Edit) – 4:09

 US 12" single
"A Little More Love" (Album Edit) – 4:10
"A Little More Love" (Album Version) – 4:34
"Set Your Loving Free" (Kenlou 12") – 7:26
"Set Your Loving Free" (Dubmaster Edit) – 4:41

Charts

References

Lisa Stansfield songs
1992 singles
Songs written by Lisa Stansfield
1991 songs
Arista Records singles
Songs written by Ian Devaney
Songs written by Andy Morris (musician)
Soul ballads
Smooth jazz songs
1990s ballads